Zec or ZEC may refer to:

 Zcash, a cryptocurrency
 Zec (surname)
 Philip Zec - a British political cartoonist who usually signed his work with only his surname
 Zone d'exploitation contrôlée, conservation areas in the Canadian province of Quebec
 Zimbabwe Electoral Commission